Looking for Nicolas Sarkozy is a 2011 French documentary film directed by William Karel. The film records the reactions of 18 non-French Paris-based journalists when Karel asked their opinions of Nicolas Sarkozy, the 23rd President of France.  It was released on TV network Arte on December 21, 2011, and pitched at the 2011 MeetMarket as part of Sheffield Doc/Fest.

References

External links
 

2011 films
French documentary films
2010s French-language films
Documentary films about politicians
2011 documentary films
Nicolas Sarkozy
Films directed by William Karel
2010s French films